Russian State Hydrometeorological University (RSHU) is a coeducational and public research university located in St. Petersburg, Russia. It was founded on July 23, 1930. For all the time RSHU have trained more than 20,000 professionals, with more than 3 000 for foreign countries. Current rector is acting Valeriy Mikheev due to the death of the previous rector Lev Karlin.

History
Russian State Hydrometeorological University was established on July 23, 1930, on the basis of Geophysical Department of the Faculty of Physics of the MSU as Moscow Hydrometeorological Institute.

After World War II the university was transferred to Leningrad and renamed as Leningrad Hydrometeorological Institut (LHI). The institute became the world's first institution of higher education with hydrometeorological profile.

In 1992 it was renamed the Russian State Hydrometeorological Institute (RSHI). In 1998 Institute was renamed as Russian State Hydrometeorological Universitet (current name).

Faculties
RSHU consists of 8 faculties:
 Meteorological Faculty 
 Hydrological Faculty 
 Oceanological Faculty 
 Ecological Faculty  
 Information Systems and Geotechnologies 
 Economics, Social Sciences and Humanities 
 Philological  
 National and Traditional Arts

University rating
Center for Promotion of graduates conducted monitoring of university centers of youth employment in 2011. According to the results of this monitoring RSHU took 12th place among the universities of the Russian Federation, and the 3rd place among the universities of St. Petersburg.

According to the rating of public universities in Russia in 2010 RSHU ranked 141 out of 1,527 Russian universities in the overall rankings, 23 out of 94 universities of St. Petersburg.
According to the rating of public universities in Russia in 2018 RSHU ranked 125 out of 1,527 Russian universities in the overall rankings, 15 out of 94 universities of St. Petersburg.

See also
 Education in Russia
 List of universities in Russia

Notes and references

 
1930 establishments in the Soviet Union
Educational institutions established in 1930
Universities and institutes established in the Soviet Union
Meteorology in the Soviet Union